Tournament Golf is a 1988 video game published by Computer Sports Network for DOS.

Gameplay
Tournament Golf is a game in which using a modem, players could compete in a nationwide golf tournament each week. It is played using Mean 18.

Reception
David S. Stevens reviewed the game for Computer Gaming World, and stated that "For those tired of competing against just the computer, CSN can provide plenty of stiff competition on some of the world's most challenging golf courses. That is something that neither family, time, nor ability would allow us to experience in 'the real world.'"

References

1988 video games
DOS games
DOS-only games
Golf video games
Multiplayer online games
Video games developed in the United States
Video games set in California
Video games set in Scotland